Weaverville is a census-designated place and the county seat of Trinity County, California, United States.  Its population is 3,667 as of the 2020 census, up from 3,600 from the 2010 census.

History

Founded in 1850, Weaverville is a historic California Gold Rush town.  Located at the foot of the current Trinity Alps Wilderness Area, Weaverville was once home to approximately 2,000 Chinese gold miners and had its own Chinatown.
Logging and tourism were the economic mainstays of Weaverville for many years. The regional economy has been in steady decline for many years, with only a small uplift brought about by the global real estate bubble. Since 1990, the unemployment rate in the county has ranged from 4.3% in September 2018 to 25.0% in January 1992. The county's unemployment rate in July 2019 was 5.1%.

Geography and climate
Weaverville is located at  (40.736687, -122.936208).

Weaverville has a Mediterranean climate (Köppen Csa, bordering on Csb), though owing to its inland valley location the town is wetter and observes much larger diurnal temperature variations, creating colder mornings, than considered prototypical for the climate type. The National Weather Service has had a cooperative weather station in Weaverville since 1894.

Demographics

Population

2010
At the 2010 census Weaverville had a population of 3,600. The racial makeup of Weaverville was 3,162 (87.8%) White, 11 (0.3%) African American, 152 (4.2%) Native American, 41 (1.1%) Asian, 1 (0.0%) Pacific Islander, 38 (1.1%) from other races, and 195 (5.4%) from two or more races. Hispanic or Latino of any race were 255 people (7.1%).

The census reported that 3,473 people (96.5% of the population) lived in households, 61 (1.7%) lived in non-institutionalized group quarters, and 66 (1.8%) were institutionalized.

There were 1,513 households, 440 (29.1%) had children under the age of 18 living in them, 622 (41.1%) were married couples living together, 185 (12.2%) had a female householder with no husband present, 112 (7.4%) had a male householder with no wife present.  There were 145 (9.6%) unmarried opposite-sex partnerships, and 12 (0.8%) same-sex married couples or partnerships. 473 households (31.3%) were one person and 196 (13.0%) had someone living alone who was 65 or older. The average household size was 2.30.  There were 919 families (60.7% of households); the average family size was 2.80.

The age distribution was 842 people (23.4%) under the age of 18, 247 people (6.9%) aged 18 to 24, 734 people (20.4%) aged 25 to 44, 1,109 people (30.8%) aged 45 to 64, and 668 people (18.6%) who were 65 or older.  The median age was 44.4 years. For every 100 females, there were 94.5 males.  For every 100 females age 18 and over, there were 91.4 males.

There were 1,675 housing units at an average density of 160.7 per square mile, of the occupied units 908 (60.0%) were owner-occupied and 605 (40.0%) were rented. The homeowner vacancy rate was 2.8%; the rental vacancy rate was 6.8%.  2,089 people (58.0% of the population) lived in owner-occupied housing units and 1,384 people (38.4%) lived in rental housing units.

2000
At the 2000 census there were 3,554 people, 1,513 households, and 960 families in the CDP. The racial makeup of the CDP was 91.5% White, 0.3% African American, 2.9% Native American, 0.7% Asian, 0.1% Pacific Islander, 1.2% from other races, and 3.3% from two or more races. Hispanic or Latino of any race were 4.3%.

Of the 1,513 households 27.9% had children under the age of 18 living with them, 47.1% were married couples living together, 12.4% had a female householder with no husband present, and 36.5% were non-families. 31.3% of households were one person and 13.8% were one person aged 65 or older.  The average household size was 2.30 and the average family size was 2.85.

The age distribution was 24.2% under the age of 18, 6.4% from 18 to 24, 23.0% from 25 to 44, 28.0% from 45 to 64, and 18.4% 65 or older.  The median age was 43 years. For every 100 females, there were 94.5 males.  For every 100 females age 18 and over, there were 90.7 males.

The median household income was $30,319 and the median family income  was $37,813. Males had a median income of $34,091 versus $24,722 for females. The per capita income for the CDP was $18,297.  About 13.2% of families and 16.3% of the population were below the poverty line, including 23.6% of those under age 18 and 5.3% of those age 65 or over.

Transportation

Major highways
 State Route 299. State route 299 runs through the middle of Weaverville. The part of SR 299 between Arcata and Redding is the Trinity Scenic Byway, a National Forest Scenic Byway.

Government

Sites of interest

In popular culture
The 1938 Warner Brothers Technicolor film Gold Is Where You Find It was filmed in and around Weaverville.
The 1975 Mary McCaslin song "The Ballad of Weaverville" gives a fictional account of the town's namesake being a gambler, Jim Weaver, who had the town named after him as his final bet, after winning all of the town's gold.
Road Trip Episode 154 with Huell Howser

References

External links

Chamber of Commerce

 
County seats in California
Census-designated places in Trinity County, California
Mining communities of the California Gold Rush
Populated places established in 1850
1850 establishments in California
Census-designated places in California